The siege of Derna was a military campaign by the Libyan National Army (LNA) to capture the city of Derna, which began after the end of the Derna campaign (2014–16).
After besieging the city for 21 months, the LNA attacked the city on 7 May 2018, beginning the Battle of Derna (2018–19) and ultimately taking the city on 12 February 2019. The siege was criticized by the National Commission for Human Rights in Libya as a war crime, as well as by the Government of National Accord.

Timeline 
In August 2017, after the Mujihadeen Executed Air Colonel Adel Jehani, whose plane was shot down by the Mujihadeen, the head of the Omar Mukhtar Operations Room tasked with taking Derna, Brigadier Salem Rifadi, declared a total blockade of Derna. He was quoted as saying that no food, medicines, cooking gas, petrol or anything else would be allowed in.

In October 2017, an air-strike hit Derna, killing at least 15 civilians and wounding 17 or more.

In December 2017, ISIL Member Mohamed Fathi Al-Jamayel was executed by the Derna Shura Council after a failed attempt to kill senior member Moaz Tashani.

In 2017 Marshal Khalifa Haftar was accused of war crimes in the recapture of Derna. It was alleged that Haftar had been complicit in calling for extrajudicial killings, arguing that Haftar had called on LNA fighters to take no prisoners, and saying in a speech: "Never mind consideration of bringing a prisoner here. There is no prison here. The field is the field, end of the story".

On 7 May 2018, the Libyan National Army started an offensive on Derna, and by February 2019 had taken the city.

See also 
 Battle of Derna (disambiguation)

References 

Military operations of the Second Libyan Civil War
Derna, Libya